The Battle of Eniwetok was a battle of the Pacific campaign of World War II, fought between 17 February 1944 and 23 February 1944, on Enewetak Atoll in the Marshall Islands. The invasion of Eniwetok followed the American success in the Battle of Kwajalein to the southeast. Capture of Eniwetok would provide an airfield and harbor to support attacks on the Mariana Islands to the northwest. The operation was officially known as "Operation Catchpole", and was a three-phase operation involving the invasion of the three main islands in the Enewetak Atoll.

Vice Admiral Raymond A. Spruance preceded the invasion with Operation Hailstone, a carrier strike against the Japanese base at Truk in the Caroline Islands. This raid destroyed 39 warships and more than 200 planes.

Background

The atoll became part of the Japanese South Seas Mandate since the end of World War I, but Japan had no military presence until November 1942, when an airfield was constructed on Engebi Island, for use only for refueling planes between Truk and islands to the east; no aviation personnel were stationed there and the island had only token defenses. When the Gilbert Islands fell to the United States, the Imperial Japanese Army assigned defense of the atoll to the 1st Amphibious Brigade, recently formed from reservists of 3rd Independent Garrison in Manchukuo. The 1st Amphibious Brigade under the command of Major General Yoshimi Nishida. arrived on 4 January 1944. The brigade had 3,940 men; however, with the loss of its supply ship Aikoku Maru during Operation Hailstone, only 2,586 men arrived on Eniwetok. These men were supplemented by aviation personnel, civilian employees, and labourers. Most were stationed on Parry Island, where General Nishida established his HQ.

Battle of Engebi
Engebi Island is at the north tip of Enewetak Atoll. The island is triangular in shape, with a palm grove on its eastern side and an airfield across its north half. The island was lightly defended by a garrison of 60 men with a battery of two 12 cm guns and two twin mounted 13 mm machine guns. The island also had 500 non-combatants. On 4 January 1944, the 1st Amphibious Brigade arrived on Eniwetok. Engebi received 692 men from the brigade and 54 naval personnel, commanded by Colonel Toshio Yano. These reinforcements had two flame throwers, thirteen grenade launchers, twelve light machine guns, four heavy machine guns, two 37 mm anti-tank guns, eleven 81mm mortars, one 20mm automatic gun, two 20 mm cannons, two Type 94 75 mm mountain guns, and three Type 95 light tanks. They were deployed on the lagoon side, where Colonel Yano expected the Americans to land. They constructed a strong point half way along the shore and smaller strong points at the island's three corners.

On 16 February United States Navy aircraft from TG 58.4 attacked Engebi. This took the airfield out of operation. It also destroyed up to 14 aircraft and one of the coastal defence guns, at the north-eastern corner of the island. The main invasion fleet arrived off Eniwetok early on 17 February.

Naval bombardment of Eniwetok began on 17 February, and at 13:18, US forces landed on Canna and Camelia islets, near Engebi. No resistance was encountered. A blocking force was placed on the island chain to the south of Engebi to stop the defenders from escaping.

At 06:55 on 18 February, the battleship  and the cruiser  began to bombard the northern and eastern end of the island. The battleships  and  opened fire on the beach defences at dawn, and at 07:20 the destroyer  began direct fire. At 08:00 a naval air attack began, and at 08:11 the naval bombardment resumed. Artillery from the islets captured on 17 February also added to the bombardment.

The main landings were carried out by two battalions from the 22nd Marine Regiment, commanded by Colonel John T. Walker, which landed on Engebi on 18 February at 08:43, (UTC+12) the next day. supported by medium tanks and two 105mm self propelled guns. There was very little resistance at the beach, except from the southern tip of the island. The airfield was quickly captured, and within an hour the tanks had reached the northern shore. The 3rd Battalion landed at 09:55 (UTC+12) and began to mop up the few remaining defenders. The island was declared secure by 14:50 (UTC+12), though mopping-up continued through the next day. US losses included 85 killed and missing plus 166 wounded. The Japanese lost 1,276 killed and 16 captured.

On 18–19 February, the Americans cleared the smaller islands, on the atoll's east side. There, they found evidence that Parry and Eniwetok Islands were more heavily defended than expected, so the battle plan was adjusted. Originally, the 106th Infantry Regiment was to invade Eniwetok and Parry simultaneously. Instead, they cleared Eniwetok first, then Parry.

Battle of Eniwetok
Eniwetok Island is a long, narrow island, widest at the western end, and very narrow on the eastern end. A road existed on the lagoon shore on the western half of the island, where the settlement was located. This topography meant that defense in depth was impossible. On Eniwetok itself, the Japanese had 779 Army troops, 24 civilians, and five naval personnel, all under the command of Lt Col. Hashida Masahiro. The defenders had two flame throwers, 13 grenade launchers, 12 light machine guns, two heavy machine guns, one 50mm mortar, eleven 81mm mortars, one 20mm automatic gun, three 20mm cannons, and three Type 95 light tanks. Most defenses were foxholes and trenches. Work had also begun on some concrete pillboxes, which were not completed.

At 07:10 (UTC+12) on 18 February, two cruisers and two destroyers opened fire on Japanese positions from the lagoon side of Eniwetok. At 07:40 (UTC+12), a third destroyer opened fire to the east of the landing beaches and, at 08:10 (UTC+12), a fourth destroyer also commenced bombardment. At 08:10 (UTC+12), naval gunfire halted for 15 minutes to allow carrier aircraft to attack. The first troops landed at 09:17 (UTC+12) but the initial landings immediately ran into problems. The short naval bombardment left many Japanese positions intact, and the American LVTs could not scale an  sand dune just inland. These early problems were quickly overcome, and the Americans reached the island's ocean shore by 11:45 (UTC+12). A Japanese counter-attack, carried out by 300–400 men, hit the western part of the American line, which was supported by mortar fire. The attack was over by 12:45 (UTC+12), and had failed to break the Americans.

At 14:25 (UTC+12), the 3rd Battalion, 22nd Marines landed.  They pushed towards the western end of the island. By nightfall, they had reached the southwest corner of the island. The Marine commander, Colonel Ayers, ordered that the attack continue through the night, to eliminate the Japanese pocket in the northwest corner. A Japanese counterattack at 09:10 (UTC+12) on 19 February reached the Marine battalion command post but was repulsed. The 3rd Battalion continued to press the attack south, along the east coast. The Japanese spider hole defensive positions were intact, with heavy undergrowth providing good defensive cover. Progress was slow, as spider holes had to be eliminated one-by-one.

The fighting in the west came to an end on the morning of 20 February; however, the island was not declared secured until 21 February. 37 Americans were killed or missing and 94 wounded. The Japanese had 800 dead and 23 prisoners.

Battle of Parry Island
Parry island was smaller than Eniwetok and more heavily defended and was the HQ of 1st Amphibious Brigade commander General Nishida. When the invasion began the Japanese had 1,115 troops and 250 other personnel on Parry, equipped with 36 heavy grenade launchers, 36 light machine guns, six heavy machine guns, ten 81mm mortars, three 20mm automatic guns, two mountain guns, one 20mm cannon and three Type 95 light tanks. The island is tear-drop shaped with the larger end to the north, facing the lagoon. The Japanese defences consisted of a series of eight strong points along the beach, protected by trenches and a network of foxholes.

Based on experience at Eniwetok, the American naval bombardment of Parry Island was more thorough. The invasion force consisted of the 1st and 2nd Battalions of the 22nd Marines, the veterans of Engebi. The 1st Battalion advancing on the right and the 2nd Battalion on the east. The landing occurred at 09:00 (UTC+12), with a combined force of Marines and tanks advancing rapidly past Japanese positions once machine gun fire had been suppressed, followed by demolition and flame-thrower squads clearing out spider holes and Japanese defenders who had been bypassed, followed by three-four men squads mopping up any survivors.

At 10:00 (UTC+12), remaining Japanese artillery was suppressed by naval bombardment, and by 11:55 (UTC+12), the 1st Battalion reached the ocean shore, and with the 2nd Battalion taking the northern tip of the island by 13:00 (UTC+12). The 1st Battalion then turned to the southern tip of the island, reinforced by the 3rd Battalion along the lagoon shore. At 19:30 (UTC+12), the regimental commander radioed "I present you with the island of Parry", though operations continued through the next day. U.S. casualties included 73 killed and missing plus 261 wounded. The vast majority of Japanese soldiers were killed, including General Nishida, although 105 survivors were captured.

Aftermath

Eniwetok Atoll provided a forward base for the United States Navy for its later operations.

See also
Naval Base Eniwetok
US Naval Advance Bases

References

Further reading

Breaking the Outer Ring: Marine Landings in the Marshall Islands

External links

 Animated History of The Battle for Eniwetok
 Soldiers of the 184th Infantry, 7th ID in the Pacific, 1943–1945

Eniwetok
Enewetak Atoll
Marshall Islands in World War II
1944 in the Marshall Islands
February 1944 events
Eniwetok
Eniwetok